The current governor of South Carolina is Henry McMaster who has been in office since January 24, 2017. South Carolina governors are counted only once; therefore, Joseph West, for instance, a colonial governor who served three non-consecutive terms, is considered the second governor of South Carolina, not the second, fourth, and seventh.

Colonial period (1670–1775)

Statehood period (1776–present)

Presidents under the Articles of Confederation
The General Assembly chose the president for a term of two years.

Parties
 (2)

Governors under the Articles of Confederation
The General Assembly chose the governor for a term of two years.

 Parties
 (4)
 (2)

Governors under the Constitution of 1790
The General Assembly chose the governor for a term of two years.

 Parties
 (3) 
 (15)
 (3)
 (17) 
 (1)

Post-Civil War Governors through the present
Governors are elected at-large
2-year term, renewable once: 1868-1927
4-year term, not renewable consecutively: 1927-1982
4-year term, renewable once consecutively: 1982–present

 Parties

Notes

See also
 Governor of South Carolina
 South Carolina gubernatorial elections
List of lieutenant governors of South Carolina
List of United States senators from South Carolina
 List of United States representatives from South Carolina
 Timeline of South Carolina

References

External links
 SCIway List of South Carolina Governors in Chronological Order
 National Governors Association List of South Carolina Governors
 “South Carolina's Colonial Governors” Preservation Society Halsey Map

Governors
Governors
South Carolina